This is a list of television programs currently, formerly, and soon to be broadcast by the Global Television Network, a national broadcast network owned by Corus Entertainment. The Global Toronto schedule is normally considered the network "base" schedule.

Current programming

Original series

Drama series
 Departure (2020)
 Family Law (2021)

Reality/documentary series
 Big Brother Canada (2015)
 Crime Beat
 Driving Television (2003)
 The Fish'n Canada Show
 Fishful Thinking
 Powerboat Television

News programming
 Entertainment Tonight Canada (2005)
 Global News Morning (2001)
 Global National (2001)
 The Morning Show (2013)
 The New Reality (2020)
 The West Block (2011)

Canadian content reruns

 BLK, An Origin Story
 Border Security: Canada's Front Line (2016)
 Carnival Eats
 Donut Showdown
 Great Chocolate Showdown
 Income Property (2020)
 Masters of Flip
 Property Brothers
 Salvage Kings
 Save My Reno (2020)
 Scott's Vacation House Rules
 Worst to First

American series

Upcoming programming

Dramas
Robyn Hood (2023)

Formerly broadcast by Global

News programming
 16x9 (November 30, 2008 – June 28, 2016)
 20/20 (1978–2003)
 60 Minutes More (1999–2000)
 A Current Affair (1993–1996)
 Canada Tonight (2001)
 Entertainment Desk
 Global Sunday (2001–2005)
 Science International/What Will They Think of Next! (1976—1979)

Talk shows
 100 Huntley Street (1977–2018)
 The Arsenio Hall Show (1993–1994)
 Context with Lorna Dueck
 The Doctors (2010–2019)
 The Great Debate (1974–1975)
 Hot Ones (2019–2022)
 The Jerry Springer Show
 The Late Late Show with Craig Ferguson
 The Late Late Show With Craig Kilborn (September 2000 to August 2004, transferred to CH system at a later point)
 Late Night with Conan O'Brien (1993)
 Late Night with David Letterman (1985–1993)
 Leeza
 A Little Late with Lilly Singh (2019–21)
 The Meredith Vieira Show
 The Mike Bullard Show
 The Queen Latifah Show (Sept 16, 2013-Sept 5, 2014)
 Sneaker Shopping (2019–2022)
 The Test (Sept, 2013-May, 2014)
 The Tonight Show Starring Johnny Carson
 The Tonight Show with Jay Leno
 TV's Bloopers & Practical Jokes
 Witness to Yesterday (1974)

Comedy programming
Canadian programs

 Bob and Margaret
 The Jane Show
 Shhh It's The News (1974)
 Second City TV (1976-1980)
 Super Dave (1988–1994)

Foreign programs

 3rd Rock from the Sun (1996–2001)
 A to Z (Dec. 9, 2015–Jan 22, 2015)
 Abby's (2019)
 About a Boy (Feb. 22, 2014–Feb. 20, 2015)
 Alice
 Allen Gregory (2011)
 America 2-Night (1978–1980)
 American Dad! (2005-2018)
 Angel from Hell
 Any Day Now (1999–2000)
 A.P. Bio (2018–2019)
 Are You Being Served?
 Are You There, Chelsea? (2012)
 Arrested Development (2003–2006)
 Baby Blues (2000)
 Bad Judge
 Battery Park (2000)
 Becker (2001–2004)
 The Benny Hill Show
 Bob's Burgers (2011–2015)
 Bram & Alice (2002)
 The Brian Benben Show (1998)
 Broke (2020)
 Carol's Second Act (2019–2020)
 Caroline in the City (1995–1999)
 Cheers (1990–1993)
 Chico and the Man (1977–1985)
 Clueless (1996–2001)
 The Cleveland Show (2009–2013)
 Coach (1989–1997)
 Cosby (1998–1999)
 Crazy Ex-Girlfriend (2015–2019)
 Daddio (2000; season 1)
 Dave's World (1993–1998)
 Dharma & Greg (1997-2001)
 Diff'rent Strokes (1983–1985)
 DiResta (1998–1999)
 Doctor in the House (1974–1975, 1981–1985)
 Doctor on the Go (1975–1979)
 E/R (1984–1985)
 Everybody Loves Raymond (2001–2005)
 The Exes (February–June 2012)
 Family Guy (1999–2015)
 Fernwood 2 Night (1977–1978)
 Ferris Bueller (1990–1991)
 Frasier (1993–2004)
 Friends (1994–2004)
 Futurama (1999–2003)
 Game of Silence (April 12-June 5, 2016)
 Gilligan's Island (1975–1984)
 Grace Under Fire
 Go On
 The Good Place (2016–2020)
 Good Sam (2022)
 Good Times (1974–1984)
 The Great Indoors (2016–2017)
 Growing Up Fisher (Feb. 23–June 11, 2014)
 Guys With Kids
 Hangin' with Mr. Cooper
 I Hate My Teenage Daughter (2011–2012)
 The Hughleys (1998-2000)
 Hogan's Heroes (1975–1976)
 How to be a Gentleman
 How We Roll (2022)
 The Jeffersons (1975–1984)
 Jesse (1998–2000)
 Just Shoot Me! (2000-2003)
 Joey (2004-2006)
 Kath & Kim (2008–2009)
 Kevin Can Wait (2016–2018)
 Kids Say the Darndest Things (2019–2020)
 King of the Hill (1997–2009)
 The Little Rascals (1975–1988)
 Love Bites (2011)
 The Love Boat (1977–1987)
 Loving Friends and Perfect Couples (1985)
 Mad About You (1992–2000)
 Mad TV
 Major Dad
 Make Me Laugh
 Malcolm in the Middle (2000–2006)
 Man with a Plan (2016–2020)
 Married... with Children
 Marry Me
 Mary Hartman, Mary Hartman (1976–1977)
 The Mary Tyler Moore Show (1981–1988)
 Maya & Marty (2016)
 Madman of the People (1994-1995)
 The Michael J. Fox Show
 The Millers (2013–2014)
 Modern Family (2019-2020)
 The Monkees (1975–1976)
 Mulaney
 My Name Is Earl (2005–2009)
 Napoleon Dynamite (2012)
 The New Addams Family (1998–2001)
 Ned and Stacey (1995–1997)
 Normal, Ohio (2000)
 Nurses
 The Odd Couple (1975–1977)
 One Day at a Time (1977–1984)
 On The Buses
 Parker Lewis Can't Lose (1990–1993)
 Partners (2014)
 Raising Hope (2010–2011)
 The Red Green Show (1994–1997)
 Rob (2012)
 Sabrina the Teenage Witch (1996–2001)
 Sanford and Son
 Schooled (2019–2020)
 Sean Saves the World
 The Single Guy (1995–1996)
 Seinfeld (1991–1998)
 The Simpsons (1989–2018)
 Single Parents (2019–2020)
 Sit Down, Shut Up (2009)
 Sledge Hammer! (1986–1988)
 Some Mothers Do 'Ave 'Em
 South Park (1997-2001)
 Spin City (2001-2002)
 Stark Raving Mad (1999–2000)
 Stay Tuned (1978–1979)
 Still Standing
 Superstore (2015–2021)
 That '70s Show (1998–2005)
 That Girl (1975–1976)
 The Thing About Pam (2022)
 'Til Death (2006–2010)
 Titus
 Truth Be Told
 Two Guys and a Girl
 United States of Al (2021–22)
 Wait Till Your Father Gets Home
 The War at Home
 We Are Men (2013)
 Welcome Back, Kotter (1977–1986)
 Welcome to the Family
 Will & Grace (1998-2006; 2017-2020)
 Wings (1990–1997)
 The Winner
 You Again? (1986–1987)

Drama programming
Canadian programs

 Adventure Inc. (2002–03)
 The Adventures of Sinbad
 Andromeda
 Blackfly
 Continuum (reruns)
 Destiny Ridge (1993-95)
 Falcon Beach
 Global Playhouse (1984–86)
 The Hardy Boys (2022)
 Jake and the Kid (1995-99)
 Mary Kills People (2017–20)
 Mutant X
 Nurses (2020–21)
 The Outer Limits
 Private Eyes (2016–22)
 Psi Factor: Chronicles of the Paranormal (1996-2003)
 Queen of Swords (2000–01)
 Ransom (2017–22)
 Remedy (Feb. 24, 2014-May 19, 2015)
 Rookie Blue (June 24, 2010 – 2019)
 Traders
 Train 48
 Troupers (1985–88)
 Zoe Busiek: Wild Card

Foreign programs

 90210 (2008–2012)
 Action (1999–2000)
 Adam-12
 Adderly
 The Agency (2001-2003)
 Alfred Hitchcock Presents
 Almost Human (2013–2014)
 American Gothic (2016)
 Awake (2012)
 Battle Creek (March 1–May 24, 2015)
 Beverly Hills, 90210 (1991–2000)
 The Black Donnellys (2007)
 The Blacklist (2013–2017)
 Blood & Treasure (2019)
 The Blue Knight
 The Bold and the Beautiful (1987-1995)
 Bomb Girls (2012–2013)
 Bones (2005–2017)
 Boston Public (2000-2004)
 Brimstone (1998–1999)
 Brothers & Sisters (2006–2011)
 Bull (2016–22)
 Charlie's Angels (1979–1988)
 Chicago Fire (2012–2019)
 Chicago Hope (1994-2000)
 Chicago Justice (2017)
 Chicago Med (2015–2019)
 Chicago PD (2014–2019)
 The Code (2019)
 The Colbys
 Columbo
 Combat Hospital (2011)
 The Commish (1991–1995)
 Constantine (2014–2015)
 Containment (April 19–July 19, 2016)
 Conviction (2006)
 Cop Rock (1990)
 Crossing Jordan
 Danger Bay (1994–1997)
 Dawson's Creek (1998-2003)
 Dark Angel (2001–02)
 Day Break
 Days of Our Lives (1984–2022)
 Destiny Ridge (1993-1995)
 Doc
 Dollhouse (2009–2011)
 Doogie Howser, M.D.
 Dracula
 Dynasty
 Early Edition (1997–2000)
 Elementary (2012–19)
 Extant
 Family Law (2001–02)
 Falcon Crest (1984–1986)
 Fantasy Island (1979–1984)
 The Finder (2012)
 Finder of Lost Loves (1984–1985)
 The Firm (2012)
 Freakylinks (2000-2001)
 Friday Night Lights
 The Fugitive
 General Hospital (1991–2000)
 Get Real (1999-2000)
 A Gifted Man (2012)
 Gilmore Girls (2000-2007)
 The Good Fight (2019)
 The Good Wife (2009–2016)
 Gracepoint (2014)
 The Guard (2008–2009)
 Guiding Light
 Hack (2002–2004)
 The Handler (2003–2004)
 Harsh Realm (1999)
 Harper's Island
 Harry's Law (2011-2012)
 Hawaii Five-0 (2010-2020)
 Heartbeat
 Hercules: The Legendary Journeys
 Heroes (2006–2010)
 Heroes Reborn
 Hotel
 Houdini & Doyle (2016, 2019)
 House (2004–2012)
 Homicide: Life on the Street (1993-1994)
 In the Heat of the Night
 The InBetween (2019)
 Instinct (2018–19)
 Ironside (2013)
 Jack & Jill (1999–2000)
 Judging Amy (2001-2005)
 Kidnapped
 Knots Landing (1983–1986)
 Kung Fu (1983–1986)
 L.A. Dragnet (2003–2004)
 Las Vegas (2003–2008)
 Last Resort (2012)
 LAX (2004–2005)
 L.A. Law
 Life (2007–2009)
 Life on Mars (2008–2009)
 Limitless (2015–2016)
 The Lyon's Den (2003)
 The Lone Gunmen (2001)
 Loving Friends and Perfect Couples (1983)
 Madam Secretary (2014–2020)
 Made in Jersey
 Matt Helm (1975–1976)
 Miami Vice (1988–1989)
 Mickey Spillane's Mike Hammer
 Midnight, Texas (2017–2019)
 Millennium (1996–1999)
 Minority Report (September 21–November 30, 2015)
 Mobile One (1975)
 Monarch (2022)
 Murder, She Wrote (1986–1996)
 My Own Worst Enemy (2008)
 The New Alfred Hitchcock Presents
 Next (2020)
 The Night Shift
 NUMB3RS (2005–2010)
 NYC 22 (2012)
 NYPD Blue (1994–2005)
 Off the Map (2011)
 Paradise Beach
 Parenthood (March 2, 2010-Jan 29, 2015)
 Partners in Crime
 Party of Five (1994–2000)
 Passions
 Pitch (2016)
 The Practice
 Presidio Med (2002–2003)
 Prime Suspect
 Prodigal Son (2019–21)
 Psych (2007–March 26, 2014)
 Pure Genius (2016-2017)
 Rawhide (1989–1990)
 Ringer (2011–2012)
 Runaway
 Ryan Caulfield: Year One (1999)
 Santa Barbara (1988-1991)
 Sleepy Hollow (2013-2016)
 Smallville (2001–2002)
 St. Elsewhere (1984–1988)
 Six Degrees (2006-2007)
 Stalker
 Standoff
 Starsky & Hutch (1979–1980)
 State of Affairs (Nov 17, 2014–Feb 16, 2015)
 The Street (2000)
 Supergirl (2015–2016)
 Shark (2006–2008)
 T. and T. (1988–1991)
 That's Life (2000–2001) 
 Threshold (2005)
 Timeless (2016–2018)
 Time of Your Life (1999–2000)
 Tommy (2020)
 Touch (2012–2013)
 Touched by an Angel (2001-2003)
 Under the Dome (2013–2015)
 The Unusuals (2009)
 Vanished
 Vegas (2012-2013)
 The Visitor (1997–1998)
 Without a Trace (2002–2007)
 Women of the Movement (2022)
 Wonderfalls
 The X-Files
 Xena: Warrior Princess

Reality programming
Canadian programs

 Adventures North
 Bake with Anna Olson (reruns; 2020)
 Backyard Builds (reruns)
 Big Food Bucket List (reruns)
 Bryan Inc. (reruns)
 Canada Sings (reruns)
 Canada's Walk of Fame (2009–2014, 2017)
 Disaster DIY (reruns)
 Fire Masters (2020–21) (reruns)
 Island of Bryan (reruns)
 Kitchen Nightmares (September 19, 2007 – September 12, 2014)
 Leave It to Bryan (reruns)
 Museum Secrets
 My Fabulous Gay Wedding
 Night Walk (AKA Night Ride, Night Music, and Night Moves)
 Profiles of Nature
 Recipe to Riches
 Rust Valley Restorers (2020–21) (reruns)
 Sarah's House (reruns)
 Til Debt Do Us Part
 Wall of Chefs (reruns)
 You Gotta Eat Here! (reruns)

Foreign programs

 American Dream Builders (March 28–May 30, 2014)
 The Apprentice
 The Apprentice: Martha Stewart (2005)
 Arrest & Trial (2000–2001)
 Average Joe (2003–2005)
 Better Late Then Never (2016–2018)
 The Celebrity Apprentice
 Code 3 (1992–1993)
 The Contender (2005)
 COPS (1990–1994)
 Cosmos: A Spacetime Odyssey (2014)
 Divorce Court
 Food for Thought
 Hotel Hell (August 13, 2012 – September 9, 2014)
 People's Choice Awards
 PokerStars TV
 Popstars
 The Real Love Boat (2022)
 Stand Up to Cancer (2010–2016)
 Victoria's Secret Fashion Show

Game shows
 Are You Smarter Than a Canadian 5th Grader?
 Bumper Stumpers (1987–1994)
 Chain Reaction (1986–1994)
 Deal or No Deal Canada
 Family Feud (1979–1980, 1988–1990)
 Hollywood Squares
 Jackpot
 Jeopardy! (1984–1991) (later aird on CTV from 1991-2008 later aired on CBC from 2008-2012)
 The Joker's Wild (1975–1977)
 The Joke's on Us
 The Last Word
 Let's Make a Deal (1981–1987)
 Lingo
 The New Newlywed Game
 The New Quiz Kids
 Pitfall (1981–1987)
 The Titan Games (2019–20)
 Wheel of Fortune (1984–1991) (Later aired on CTV from 1991-2008 later aird on CBC from 2008-2012)
 Who Wants to Be a Millionaire (2019)
 Wipeout (Seasons 1 to 5 only; then formerly aired 6 to 7 by Citytv)

Children's programming
Canadian programs

 Ace Ventura: Pet Detective (1996–1998)
 The Adventures of Teddy Ruxpin (1987–1997)
 Adventures of the Little Koala (1990–1991)
 Animorphs (1998–2000)
 Astro Boy (1985–1990, 1993–1995)
 Babar (1994–2001)
 Ballooner Landing (1990–1993)
 Beetlejuice (1989–1998)
 The Big Garage (1997–1998, 2000–2001)
 Blazing Dragons (2001–2002)
 Blue Rainbow (1987–2000)
 Care Bears (1986–2001)
 Circle Square (1975–1996)
 C.L.Y.D.E. (1993–1996)
 Commander Crumbcake (1988–1993)
 Dog City (1992–2001)
 Ewoks (1985–1992)
 Fibi's Funny Bones (1999–2001)
 Flash Forward (2000–2002)
 Free Willy (1994–1995)
 Hammy Hamster (1978–1987)
 The KangaZoo Club (1984–1989)
 Kidsbeat (1982–1998)
 Kids Can Rock and Roll (1993–1996)
 Kidstreet (1990–1995)
 Kidsworld (1978–1981)
 Kitty Cats (1993–1997)
 The Little Flying Bears (1993–1995)
 The Mighty Hercules (1979–1991)
 Mr. Wizard's World (1986–1993)
 My Pet Monster (1987–1993)
 The Mystery Files of Shelby Woo (2001–2003)
 The Neverending Story (2000–2002)
 The New Adventures of Pinocchio (1983–1988)
 Nilus the Sandman (2003–2004)
 Ovide and the Gang (1989–1993)
 Popular Mechanics for Kids (1997–2004)
 Prairie Berry Pie (2000–2004)
 Ready or Not (1993–2002)
 Real Kids, Real Adventures (2000–2004)
 Sharky and George (1994–1996)
 Sharon, Lois & Bram's Elephant Show (1996–1999)
 The Smoggies (1989–1995)
 Size Small (1982–1993)
 Something Else (1989–1991)
 Star Wars: Droids (1985–1992)
 Strange Days at Blake Holsey High (2002–2006)
 Student Bodies (1997–2001)
 Tales From the Cryptkeeper (1995–1998)
 Tales of the Wizard of Oz (1983–1993)
 Tell-A-Tale Town (1993–2000)
 The Toothbrush Family (1986–1987)
 The Undersea Adventures of Captain Nemo (1983–1988)
 What Will They Think Of Next! (1976–1987)
 Young Robin Hood (1993–1997)

Foreign programs

 The Addams Family (1992–1993)
 All About Us (2001)
 Alvin and the Chipmunks (1983–1990)
 Animaniacs (1993–2000)
 Back to the Future (1991–1993)
 Batman: The Animated Series (1992–1995)
 Batman Beyond (1999–2000)
 Battle of the Planets (1978–1984)
 Bill & Ted's Excellent Adventures (1990–1991)
 Bobby's World (1993–1998)
 Bob Morane (2000–2002)
 The Bugs Bunny/Road Runner Show (1978–1982)
 The Bugs Bunny & Tweety Show (1990–2001)
 Bugs 'n' Daffy (1996–1998)
 Captain N and The Adventures of Super Mario Bros. 3 (1990)
 Captain N and the New Super Mario World (1991–1992)
 Casper (1996–1998)
 C Bear and Jamal (1996–1998)
 City Guys (1997–2001)
 COPS (1988–1993)
 Dennis the Menace (1988–1993)
 Digimon: Digital Monsters (2000–2002)
 Droopy, Master Detective (1993–1994)
 Eek! the Cat (1993–1995)
 Eerie, Indiana (1997–1999)
 Eerie, Indiana: The Other Dimension (1998–2001)
 Fraggle Rock: The Animated Series (1987–1988)
 Freakazoid! (1995–1997)
 Godzilla: The Series (1998–2000)
 Hammerman (1991–1992)
 Hang Time (1995–2001)
 He-Man and the Masters of the Universe (1984–1986)
 Inspector Gadget (1985–2004)
 It's Punky Brewster (1986–1987)
 The Journey of Allen Strange (1998–2001)
 Just Deal (2000)
 Kidd Video (1984–1985)
 Life with Louie (1995–1998)
 The Littles (1984–1985)
 Malibu, CA (1998–2000)
 Men in Black: The Series (1997–2000)
 Mighty Morphin Power Rangers (1993–1994)
 Mister T (1984–1985)
 Jim Henson's Muppet Babies (1991)
 My Little Pony 'n Friends (1986–1988)
 Mystic Knights of Tir Na Nog (1998–1999)
 New Kids on the Block (1990–1991)
 One World (1998–2000)
 Pee-wee's Playhouse (1988–1991)
 The Pink Panther Show (1975–1978)
 Pinky and the Brain (1995–2000)
 The Plucky Duck Show (1992–1993)
 Police Academy (1990)
 ProStars (1991–1992)
 Sailor Moon (1995–1998)
 Saved by the Bell (1993–1999)
 Saved by the Bell: The New Class (1993–2000)
 Scooby-Doo (1979–1988)
 Slimer! and the Real Ghostbusters (1987–1991)
 The Smurfs (1982–1990)
 Sonic the Hedgehog (1993–1995)
 Space Goofs (1997–1998)
 The Sports Illustrated for Kids Show (1998–2000)
 Superman: The Animated Series (1997–1999)
 The Super Mario Bros. Super Show! (1990–1991)
 The Sylvester & Tweety Mysteries (1995–1998)
 Teenage Mutant Ninja Turtles (1993)
 Tiny Toon Adventures (1990–1997)
 Tom & Jerry Kids (1990–1994)
 Toonsylvania (1998–1999)
 The Weird Al Show (1997–1998)
 Yo, Yogi! (1991–1992)
 Zoo Family (1989–1990)

Sports programming
 Canadian Football League (1987–1990)
 ECW on Syfy (2006–2010)
 National Football League (1979–2007)
 National Hockey League (1987–1988)
 PGA Tour
 WWE NXT
 Superstars of Volleyball
 Toronto Blizzard NASL soccer

See also
 Global Television Network
 List of programs broadcast by Global Reality Channel
 List of Canadian television series

References

External links
Global Television Programming through the years - Canadian Communications Foundation

Global